Leonardo Nam (born November 5, 1979) is an Argentine actor. He made his breakthrough as Roy in The Perfect Score (2004), and gained further recognition for his roles as Morimoto in The Fast and the Furious: Tokyo Drift (2006) and Brian McBrian in The Sisterhood of the Traveling Pants 2 (2008).

In 2016, Nam began starring as Felix Lutz in Westworld (2016–present) which brought him widespread recognition.

Early life
Nam was born in Buenos Aires, Argentina, to South Korean immigrant parents. At the age of six, he moved to Sydney, Australia. Nam attended Sydney Technical High School and studied architecture at the University of New South Wales. Nam left Sydney to follow his dreams of an acting career in New York City, United States, at the age of 19. He studied with several acting teachers in New York, namely Austin Pendleton and William Carden at HB Studio.

Career
Before his Hollywood success, Nam travelled to New York City to pursue his acting career. His first few nights he slept in Central Park and then found jobs working as a waiter and bartender. His breakthrough role came in his performance of Roy in The Perfect Score (2004). He had a small role in the 2005 film The Sisterhood of the Traveling Pants as Brian McBrian, a hardcore gamer. He played Brian again in The Sisterhood of the Traveling Pants 2; in the sequel, his character has a larger role. Nam also made an appearance in The Fast and the Furious: Tokyo Drift (2006) as Morimoto. In 2016, he joined the cast of the HBO series Westworld. In 2018 he was featured in the music video "Waste It on Me" by Steve Aoki featuring BTS.

Personal life
Nam is married to Michael Dodge. They have twin sons (born 2017) together. The family lives in San Diego.

Filmography

Film

Television

Music videos

References

External links

UGO Interview

1979 births
Argentine emigrants to Australia
Argentine people of Korean descent
Australian male film actors
Australian people of Korean descent
Australian expatriate male actors in the United States
Australian gay actors
Living people
Male actors from Buenos Aires
Male actors from Sydney
University of New South Wales alumni
People educated at Sydney Technical High School
Male actors of Korean descent
Argentine gay actors
Australian people of Asian descent